is a Japanese electronics company and founded by Junji Hada in Osaka, Japan in 1986. The company introduced an oval mouse in 1988 that became a global standard design. They manufacture office and other furniture for using with electronics, computer peripherals, gaming peripherals, computer memory and USB flash drives, keyboards, and many other related devices.

The company and its subsidiaries have offices worldwide, including in South Korea, the Philippines, the United States, The Netherlands, Germany, and China. Elecom has had the top marketshare in Japan for mobile phone audio accessories, mobile phone battery chargers, smartphone cases, smartphone screen protectors, and tablet accessories since 2017.

History
The company opened a facility in Miyakojima-ku and manufactured office furniture such as computer desks. In November of the same year, they opened an office in Itabashi in Tokyo. The following November, offices were opened in Nagoya and Fukuoka. They introduced an oval mouse in 1988, different than the common rectangular mouse that was popular at that time, and the oval mouse became the global standard. A Tokyo distribution center was opened in December 1988.

Their first ten key keyboard was launched in September 1989. The following September, an office was opened in Sapporo, and their Sendai office was expanded to include a distribution center in March 1991.  was spun-off in July 1991, with offices in Minamikawachi. Elecom Computer Products was established in the United States in September 1992.

Seiko Epson sued Elecom and manufacturer Ester Industries in September 2000, claiming that Elecom's manufacturing and sales of ink cartridges compatible with Epson printers infringed on their patent. The suit was dismissed in March 2002 when the Japan Patent Office withdrew Seiko Epson's patent, stating it did not meet the requirement for originality.

Elecom won the top spot in the categories for mobile phone audio accessory, mobile phone battery charger, smartphone case, smartphone screen protector, and tablet accessory every year from 2017 to 2020 in the annual BCN Awards (given out by the POS marketing information company BCN since 2000). Due to COVID-19, demand for webcams and microphones tripled or quadrupled due to the increase in people working from home. At the same time, due to the increase in popularity of notebook computers, the demand for its computer stands has sharply decreased, causing them to quickly change the company's product focus.

A charity golf tournament was hosted by Elecom at the Yomiuri Country Club in on June 17, 2020 to raise money for healthcare workers due to the impact of COVID-19. It was the first professional golf tournament since the spread of the virus.

In June 2020, Daiwa Securities reported they had reduced their holdings in Elecom from 5.20 percent to 3.45 percent.

Products
The company is best known for their modern design, especially with their mice. Elecom controls a large percent of the market share in Japan in various product categories, including #1 in computer mice, keyboards, and speakers in 2010. Its products have won the Good Design Award 106 times between 1993 and 2019.

The company produces electronics as an OEM that are shipped to many outside and larger companies. In 2020 in Japan, they controlled 57.2 percent of the tablet accessory market, 49.5 percent of the mobile phone audio accessory market, 31.2 percent of the smartphone case market, 38.3 percent of the smartphone screen protector market, and 33.3 percent of the mobile phone battery charger market.

They manufacture many different products:
AV accessories: computer speakers, headphones, loudspeakers, and television and stereo equipment stands.
Carrying cases for laptops, tablets, and other electronic devices
Computer accessories and peripherals: Ethernet cables (including patch cables), gamepads, hard disks (including solid-state drives), keyboards, LCD filters, memory, memory card readers, mice (including optical and trackballs), mousepads, printer ink and toner (including inkjet refill kits and toner refills), SD cards, and USB devices and accessories (including cables, flash drives, and hubs)
Mobile phone accessories (including cases)
Office furniture, including computer desks and stands, office chairs, and printer and accessory stands

Subsidiaries
Elecom has subsidiaries in Japan and around the world:
D-Clue Technologies
DX Antenna (founded in August 1953, bought from Funai in 2017)
DX Antenna Marketing 
DX Antenna Philippines 
Elecom Shanghai (新宜丽客(上海)商贸有限公司)
Elecom Hong Kong
Elecom Sales Hong Kong
Elecom Korea
Elecom Singapore
Elecom Support & Service
Elecom Healthcare
Hagiwara Solutions (founded in November 1971 as "Hagiwara Sys-Com", went bankrupt in 2011, absorbed as a subsidiary into Elecom)
Logitec (founded in June 1982, purchased by Elecom in December 2004 via stock buyout)
Logitec INA Solutions

See also
 List of companies of Japan

Notes

References

External links

Japanese companies established in 1986
Computer companies established in 1986
Computer memory companies
Computer peripheral companies
Computer storage companies
Computer companies of Japan
Electronics companies of Japan
Engineering companies of Japan
Furniture companies of Japan
Japanese brands
Manufacturing companies based in Osaka
Companies listed on the Tokyo Stock Exchange
Multinational companies headquartered in Japan